Qazi Ahmed Yasir is a Kashmiri political leader, the former Mirwaiz of Southern Kashmir and a renowned scholar. He was suspended from the post of Mirwaiz in 2018, after a video appeared allegedly showing him in an obscene act with a woman, though the case is being investigated by a body of socio, political, legal and religious activists from the Kashmir valley.

Life
Yasir's family finds its roots in the times of Kashmiri ruler Yusuf Shah Chak. His grandfather founded J&K Tableegh ul Islam in southern Kashmir. His father, Dr. Qazi Nisar , was one of the greatest scholars of South Asia. He founded the Islamic Research Institute in 1985; the institute produces at least fifty Islamic preachers and scholars every year. Dr. Qazi Nisar was also the founder of MUF.

Yasir was born in 1984 in South Kashmir's township, Anantnag, and pursued his primary education there in a local school, Hanfiya High School. At an early age of 9 years he was arrested by Indian Army and tortured inhumanely. After his father, Dr. Qazi Nisar was martyred in 1994,he was titled as the head preacher of South Kashmir by Mufti Rasheed, the head Mufti of South Kashmir. He went to Al Jamiat Ul Ashrafiya to receive Islamic education and stayed there for six years. He moved to Aligarh Muslim University, where he completed his graduation in Islamic Studies and also received his master's degree in Islamic studies.

Yasir returned to Kashmir Valley in 2006, and in April 2007, he led a hunger strike against a wine shop in the district that had been opened near two educational institutes. The wine shop was shut down after four days of the hunger strike. In 2008, he led the agitation in Southern Kashmir against SASB After the same, the demand rose against the saffron terrorists who blocked rations and supplies to the valley at Jammu. In 2009 he led an agitation against a sex scandal involving many people backed by state and law enforcement agencies. He also led the agitation against a double-rape and triple-murder case at Shopian earlier that year. In 2009 he raised a fatwa in favour of stone throwing.
 
In the summer of 2010, the valley again saw an uprising and Yasir as the lone leader in this southern town. He also called for a social boycott with the local police.

In 2004, he had returned to the valley to find himself arrested when he was scheduled to address a pro freedom group at Seer, a village in southern Kashmir. He was arrested and sent to Central Jail Srinagar for two weeks, along with five of his associates. The same year during his vacations, he was arrested one more time, when many teenagers were arrested for their alleged involvement in militant activities.

He was arrested again in 2008, but he was released after public outrage. Again in 2010 he was booked under PSA for 17 months and lodged in Kot Bhalwal Jammu. He was released and arrested again in 2012 for one month, and in 2013 for two months.

Mirwaiz Qazi Ahmed Yasir and Ummat e Islami worked for relief and rehabilitation operations during the catastrophic floods that hit the state. The area of operation though remained confined to the Southern Kashmir. In 2015, he was arrested several times and he also challenged the government openly on the controversial "beef ban" Mirwaiz Yasir. In the same year, he laid the foundation of Khyri Aam Trust which provides food and Langar services for the poor and provides financial assistance to the downtrodden. He was given less or no space to perform his religious and social duties and was put behind bars constantly.

In 2016, Mirwaiz Qazi Yasir was arrested for a span of more than 4 months. During this time Ummat e Islami launched a massive relief operation and distributed relief in the curfew bound parts of Kashmir valley that had shut after the killing of Burhan wani on July 8, 2016. During this workers of Ummat e Islami's relief wing were arrested by Jammu Kashmir Police. After his release in November 2016, Mirwaiz Qazi yasir became more militant in his approach towards the Pro Freedom struggle. His activities remained cornered around visiting the houses of Militants and the victims of the conflict at a large. During this time, it was also said that Qazi yasir was providing support to local Militant groups. "There were many threats to Qazi Yasir, he was being harassed by forces and asked to stop supporting Militants and militancy, however he did not budge, so they were planning something big against him," a top aide of Qazi Yasir says.

Controversy 
In 2018, a video surfaced on social media showing Qazi Yasir in an "obscene" video. As these charges appeared, Yasir was suspended as the Mirwaiz of South Kashmir until investigations. The girl however in a video circulated on social media later claimed that she was used in the entire episode and the video was morphed and so were her conversations. She also claimed that all the allegations against Qazi Yasir are baseless. The investigations were launched by a team of various prominent clerics, Civil society members, Advocates and others. The investigations are ongoing and Yasir remains suspended from the post of Mirwaiz.

But Yasir has remained chairman of Ummat e Islami, his own party. Many attribute this episode as the downfall of Yasir, derided as Digital Moulvi.

But Qazi Yasir got reinstated since the allegations against him were not proven. He was elected as the Chairman of Bazm-e-Qadriya, after the demise of his grandfather. On August 17, 2020, Qazi Yasir along with hundreds of youth held a protest against “blasphemous” remarks on Muhammad.

Contributions 

 Demanded release of political prisoners 
 Laid foundation stone of house destroyed in gunfight 
 Held a demonstration in support of the 8 year old rape Victim Asifa at Jamia Masjid in Islamabad area of South Kashmir.
 Raised voice against the harassments in Shopian district allegedly by the armed forces.

References

1984 births
Living people
Indian Islamic religious leaders
Scholars from Jammu and Kashmir